Founded by patients in 1986, the Lymphoma Association is a charitable organisation based in the United Kingdom that offers medical information and emotional support to lymphatic cancer patients, their families, friends and carers.

The charity operates a "freephone helpline" which offers support and information.

See also 
 Cancer in the United Kingdom

References

External links
 Lymphoma Association

Health charities in the United Kingdom
Cancer organisations based in the United Kingdom